Shweta Mahale is an Indian politician and BJP leader from Buldhana district. She defeated Rahul Bondre, sitting Congress MLA from Chikhali Assembly Constituency in 2019.

References 

Maharashtra MLAs 2019–2024
People from Buldhana district
Bharatiya Janata Party politicians from Maharashtra
1983 births
Living people